John Duncan McRae (May 28, 1915 – June 25, 1999) was a Canadian politician. He served in the Legislative Assembly of British Columbia from 1949 to 1952  from the electoral district of Prince Rupert, a member of the Coalition government.

References

1915 births
1999 deaths
Politicians from San Diego
American emigrants to Canada
Members of the Legislative Assembly of British Columbia